is a Quasi-National Park on the coast of Kagoshima Prefecture and Miyazaki Prefecture, Japan.

See also

 List of national parks of Japan

References

National parks of Japan
Parks and gardens in Kagoshima Prefecture
Parks and gardens in Miyazaki Prefecture
Protected areas established in 1955
1955 establishments in Japan